Pauahia is a genus of fungi in the family Meliolaceae.

The genus name of Pauahia is in honour of Bernice Pauahi Bishop (1831–1884), a princess of the Royal Family of the Kingdom of Hawaii and a well known philanthropist.
It was published in Mus. Bull. Vol.19 on page 17 in 1925 by Frank Lincoln Stevens.

References

External links
Index Fungorum

Fungal plant pathogens and diseases
Meliolaceae
Plants described in 1925